45 Calibre Echo is a 1932 American Western film directed by Bruce M. Mitchell and starring Jack Perrin, Ben Corbett and Elinor Fair. The supporting cast features Ruth Renick in her final theatrical film role.

Cast
 Jack Perrin as Jack 
 Ben Corbett as Bennie 
 Elinor Fair as Betty 
 Olin Francis as Burly Henchman 
 Richard Cramer as Saloon Owner 
 George Chesebro as Henchman 
 Jimmy Aubrey as Jim - the Sidekick 
 C.V. Bussey as Sheriff 
 Ruth Renick as Jack's Sister 
 Murdock MacQuarrie as Old Man in Saloon

References

Bibliography
 Michael R. Pitts. Poverty Row Studios, 1929–1940: An Illustrated History of 55 Independent Film Companies, with a Filmography for Each. McFarland & Company, 2005.

External links
 

1932 films
1932 Western (genre) films
American Western (genre) films
Films directed by Bruce M. Mitchell
1930s English-language films
1930s American films